The Avia M 337 (originally designated the Walter M337) is an inverted six-cylinder air-cooled inline engine. It was developed by the Czechoslovak company as a six-cylinder derivative of the four-cylinder M 332 engine, going into production in 1960. An unsupercharged version of the M 337 is designated as the LOM M137. Production transferred to Avia in 1964, and to Letecke Opravny Malesice (LOM) in 1992.

Variants
M 337A Basic supercharged engine - not rated for aerobatics
M 337R Modified for pusher installation
M 337AK modified oil system for unlimited inverted flying.  "Snap" aerobatics permitted.
M 337AK1AK fitted with alternator instead of generator
M 337BIncreased max running speed (3000 rpm) - increased power -  .
M 337BKAerobatic version of B.
M 337CIncreased compression ratio -  
M 137A Unsupercharged version of M 337   take-off power. Aerobatics allowed.
M 137AZAs M 137A, with filtered air feed
M 437 Gear ratio 0.7:1

Applications
 AeroVolga LA-8C
 Falconar SAL Mustang
 Let L-200 Morava
 Zlín Z 526, Z 726
 Zlín 142
 Zlín Z 43

Specifications (M 337)

References

 
 http://www.walterjinonice.cz/historie-spolecnosti-walter 

Aircraft air-cooled inline piston engines
1960s aircraft piston engines
Inverted aircraft piston engines
Walter aircraft engines
LOM Praha aircraft engines